Hugo Gonçalves Ferreira Neto (born 20 September 2001), simply known as Hugo, is a Brazilian footballer who plays as a left back for Botafogo.

Club career
Born in Cabedelo, Paraíba, Hugo joined Botafogo's youth setup in 2019, from Corinthians. He made his first team – and Série A – debut on 20 September 2020, coming on as a late substitute for Victor Luis in a 0–0 home draw against Santos.

On 12 November 2021, Hugo renewed his contract with Bota until 2024.

Career statistics

Honours
Botafogo
 Campeonato Brasileiro Série B: 2021

References

2001 births
Living people
Sportspeople from Paraíba
Brazilian footballers
Association football defenders
Campeonato Brasileiro Série A players
Campeonato Brasileiro Série B players
Botafogo de Futebol e Regatas players